The Antillian snake eel (Ophichthus spinicauda, also known commonly as the spinefin snake eel or the banded snake eel) is an eel in the family Ophichthidae (worm/snake eels). It was described by John Roxborough Norman in 1922. It is a marine, deep water-dwelling eel which is known from the western central Atlantic Ocean, including Cuba, Puerto Rico, Trinidad-Tobago, and Venezuela. It is known to dwell at a maximum depth of 300 meters, and inhabits coastal waters. Males can reach a maximum total length of 107 centimeters, but more commonly reach a TL of 70 cm.

The Antillian snake eel is of minor commercial interest to fisheries.

References

Taxa named by John Roxborough Norman
Fish described in 1922
Ophichthus